Benin competed at the 1996 Summer Olympics in Atlanta, United States.

Athletics 

Men
Track and road events

Women
Track and road events

References
Official Olympic Reports

Nations at the 1996 Summer Olympics
1996
Olympics